Matthaeus Mac Cathasaigh (some sources Matthew MacCathasaid) was a priest in Ireland during the  14th century.

He was Archdeacon of Clogher from 1356 to 1361 when he became Bishop of Clogher.

References

14th-century Roman Catholic bishops in Ireland
Pre-Reformation bishops of Clogher
Archdeacons of Clogher